Tangeh-ye Raz (also Romanized as Tangeh-ye Rāz and Tangeh Rāz; also known as Tangeh-ye Zār) is a village in Raz Rural District, Raz and Jargalan District, Bojnord County, North Khorasan Province, Iran. At the 2006 census, its population was 355, in 90 families.

References 

Populated places in Bojnord County